Hana Mandlíková was the defending champion but lost in the semifinals to Martina Navratilova.

Navratilova won in the final 6–0, 6–2 against Pam Shriver.

Seeds
A champion seed is indicated in bold text while text in italics indicates the round in which that seed was eliminated.

  Martina Navratilova (champion)
  Pam Shriver (final)
  Gabriela Sabatini (semifinals)
  Hana Mandlíková (semifinals)
  Helena Suková (quarterfinals)
  Zina Garrison (quarterfinals)
  Barbara Potter (quarterfinals)
  Natasha Zvereva (quarterfinals)

Draw

References
 1988 Virginia Slims of Washington Draw

Virginia Slims of Washington
1988 WTA Tour